Csaba Vámosi (born 28 September 1975) is a Hungarian football defender.

References

1975 births
Living people
Hungarian footballers
Vác FC players
Ferencvárosi TC footballers
Győri ETO FC players
FC Tatabánya players
Budapest Honvéd FC players
Kecskeméti TE players
Diósgyőri VTK players
Mezőkövesdi SE footballers
Nemzeti Bajnokság I players
Association football defenders